Sarkal Kassar(سرکال کسر) is located in Chakwal District, Punjab, Pakistan..

Geography
Sarkal kassar is a village of around seven thousand population, located at 33°8'52.9"N 72°54'16.8"E  right on the north-eastern boundary of Chakwal District at the intersection of three police service areas. (i.e. P.S Dhudial of Chakwal and P.S Chauntra and Jatli of Rawalpindi)

History
In 997 CE, Sultan Mahmud Ghaznavi, took over the Ghaznavid dynasty empire established by his father, Sultan Sebuktegin, In 1005 he conquered the Shahis in Kabul in 1005, and followed it by the conquests of Punjab region. The Delhi Sultanate and later Mughal Empire ruled the region. The Punjab region became predominantly Muslim due to missionary Sufi saints whose dargahs dot the landscape of Punjab region.
Sarkal Kassar is one of the oldest villages of Chakwal District. It was densely populated with Muslims and minority of  Hindus and Sikhs. The predominantly Muslim population supported Muslim League and Pakistan Movement. After the independence of Pakistan in 1947, the minority Hindus and Sikhs migrated to India while the Muslims refugees from India settled down in the Chakwal District.

Tribes and Clans

Awans اعوان
Awans اعوان comprise above 80% of the population are the village's most prominent tribes. They are further sub-divided into four Clans, i.e.:
Jhallay جھلے,
Dhingal دھنگال, 
Dhoray ڈھورے, and 
Malkal ملکال sub-clans.

Other important tribes are:
Kassar ،جٹ, 
Chanr چہان, 
Bairay بیرے, 
Sowain وائیں, 
Khurnay کھرنے, 
Miyal میال, 
Bhatti بھٹی
Jogi جوگی, 
Rupar روپڑ, 
Jaaray جاڑے,
Siralye کرھن 
Shhaal شھال
Malyaar ملیار.
Supporting Casts غیر کاشتکار قومیں

References

Populated places in Chakwal District